Mallinātha Sūri was an eminent critic, known for his commentaries on five mahakavyas (great compositions) of Sanskrit. During his times, he is said to have received the titles of Mahamahopadhyaya and Vyakhyana Chakravarti. He lived during the reigns of Rachakonda king Singabhupala and Vijayanagara king Deva Raya I. Based on the evidence from the inscriptions, it is estimated that he lived between 1350-1450 CE.

Early life
Mallinātha's surname was Kolachala, Kolachela, Kolichala or Kolichelama. The village Kolichelama (currently known as Kolchāram) is near Medak, a  village and mandal in the Medak District of Telangana. When Kākatīya rule ended, the scholars of Kolachelama family migrated to Rāchakonḍa, the capital of Singabhūpāla. From the colophons of Sanjīvani, it is known that Singabhūpāla honoured Mallinātha with the title of Mahāmahopādhyāya, and Mallinātha's son with the title of Mahopādhyāya.

Works
Mallinātha is well known as a commentator who has written glosses on Classical epics of Sanskrit, besides his commentaries on Śāstric works. His Sanjivani commentary on Meghasandesa is the most popular one. He is also known as a poet, the fact which is rather unknown, though the names of his creative compositions are known to the scholars of Sanskrit literature.

Commentaries
The following is the list of his commentaries on Classical Epics of Sanskrit-
 Sañjīvinī - Commentary on Kālidāsa's Raghuvaṃśa, Kumārasambhava and Meghadūta
 Ghaṇṭāpatha - Commentary on Bhāravi's Kirātārjunīya
 Sarvāṅkaṣa - Commentary on Māgha's Śiśupālavadha
 Jīvātu - Commentary on Śrīharṣa's Naiṣadhīyacarita
 Sarvapathīnā - Commentary on Bhaṭṭikāvya
The following is the list of his commentaries on Śāstric works-
 Tarala - commentary on Vidyādhara's Ekāvalī - alaṃkāra śāstra
 Niṣkaṇṭakā - commentary on Varadarāja's Tārkikarakṣā ṭīkā

Creative works
 Raghuvīracaritā
 Vaiśyavamśa Sudhākara
 Udāra Kāvya
Interestingly, in Marathi Language, there is a word 'Mallinathi', which means 'a comment or criticism' done by somebody. For example, Mr. Jadhav doing "Mallinathi" on statement issued by Mr. Pawar said that, Mr. Pawar is misguiding the people.

References

Bibliography 
 Mallināthamanīṣā : a collection of papers presented at the Seminar on Mallinatha, edited by P. G. Lalye, Published 1981, Dept. of Sanskrit, Osmania University
 Mallinātha by P. G. Lalye, Sahitya Akademi
  Mallinātha's Ghaṇṭāpatha on the Kirātārjunīya I-VI: Part one: Introduction, Translation and Notes by Roodbergen JAF, Lieden: E. J. Brill, 1984
 http://www.thehindu.com/todays-paper/tp-national/tp-andhrapradesh/a-sorry-comment-on-kolcharams-literary-stalwart/article3163121.ece

Indian Sanskrit scholars
Sanskrit poets
14th-century Indian poets
Telugu poets
15th-century Indian poets
People from Medak district
Year of death unknown
Year of birth unknown
Indian male poets
Poets from Andhra Pradesh
1346 births